Mount Hermon is a township in Pasquotank County, North Carolina.  Bordering Nixonton, Providence, Elizabeth City, and Perquimans County, this township has an area of 34.7 square miles and a population of 4,206 (as of 2000).

References

 

Townships in Pasquotank County, North Carolina
Elizabeth City, North Carolina micropolitan area
Townships in North Carolina